Swat District is a district in the Malakand Division of Khyber Pakhtunkhwa, Pakistan. With a population of 2,309,570 per the 2017 national census, Swat is the 15th-largest district of Khyber Pakhtunkhwa province.

Swat District is centered on the Valley of Swat, usually referred to simply as Swat, which is a natural geographic region surrounding the Swat River. The valley was a major centre of early Buddhism under the ancient kingdom of Gandhara, and was a major centre of Gandharan Buddhism, with pockets of Buddhism persisting in the valley until the 10th century, after which the area became largely Muslim. Until 1969, Swat was part of the Yusafzai State of Swat, a self-governing princely state that was inherited by Pakistan following its independence from British rule. The region was seized by the Tehrik-i-Taliban in late-2007 until Pakistani control was re-established in mid-2009.

With lush forests, verdant alpine meadows, and snow-capped mountains, Swat is one of the country's most popular tourist destinations.

Etymology 
The name "Swat" is derived from the Swat River. The Swat River referred to as the Suvāstu in the Rig Veda, with a literal meaning "of fair dwellings". 
Some have suggested the Sanskrit name may mean "clear blue water." Another theory derives the word Swat from the Sanskrit word shveta, also used to describe the clear water of the Swat River. To the ancient Greeks, the river was known as the Soastus. The Chinese pilgrim Faxian referred to Swat as the Su-ho-to.

Geography 

In terms of administrative divisions, Swat is surrounded by Chitral, Upper Dir and Lower Dir to the west, Gilgit-Baltistan to the north, and Kohistan, Buner and Shangla to the east and southeast, respectively. The former tehsil of Buner was granted the status of a separate district in 1991.

The Swat Valley is enclosed by mountains that forms a natural geographic boundaries for it. The Swat River whose headwaters arise in the 18,000-19,000 foot tall Hindu Kush run through the length of the region. The main area consists of many sub valleys such as Kalam, Bahrain, Matiltan, Utror, and Gabral.

Valley 
The Valley of Swat is delineated by natural geographic boundaries, and is centered on the Swat River, whose headwaters arise in the 18,000-19,000 foot tall Hindu Kush. The valley is enclosed on all sides by mountains, and is intersected by glens and ravines. Above mountains ridges to the west is the valley of the Panjkora River, to the north the Gilgit Valley, and Indus River gorges to the east. To the south, across a series of low mountains, lies the wide Peshawar valley.

The northernmost area of Swat district are the high valleys and alpine meadows of Swat Kohistan, a region where numerous glaciers feed the Usho, and Gabral rivers (also known as the Utrar River), which form a confluence at Kalam, and thereafter forms the Swat river - which forms the spine of the Swat Valley and district. Swat then is characterized by thick forests along the narrow gorges of the Kalam Valley until the city of Madyan. From there, the river courses gently for 160 km through the wider Yousufzai Plains of the lower Swat Valley until Chakdara.

Climate 
Climate in Swat is a function of altitude, with mountains in the Kohistan region snow-clad year round. The upper areas of the region are relatively colder and often get snowfall in the winter. Drier, warmer temperatures in the lower portions in the Yousafzai Plains where summer temperatures can reach , although the lower plains experience occasional snow. Both regions are subject to two monsoon seasons - one in winter and the other in summer. Swat's lower reaches have vegetation characterized by dry bush and deciduous trees, while the upper areas mostly have thick pine forests.

History

Ancient 
The Gandhara grave culture that emerged c. 1400 BCE and lasted until 800 BCE, and named for their distinct funerary practices, was found along the Middle Swat River course.

Greek 
In 327 BCE, Alexander the Great fought his way to Odigram and Barikot and stormed their battlements; in Greek accounts, these towns are identified as Ora and Bazira. After the Alexandrian invasion of Swat, and adjacent regions of Buner, control of the wider Gandhara region was handed to Seleucus I Nicator.

Gandhara

In 305 BCE, the Mauryan Emperor conquered the wider region from the Greeks, and probably established control of Swat, until their control of the region ceased around 187 BCE. It was during the rule of the Mauryan emperor Ashoka that Buddhism was introduced into Swat, and some of the earliest stupas built in the region.

Following collapse of Mauryan rule, Swat came under control of the Greco-Bactrians, and briefly the Scythians of the Central Asian Steppe.

The region of Gandhara (based in the Peshawar valley and the adjacent hilly regions of Swat, Buner, Dir, and Bajaur), broke away from Greco-Bactrian rule to establish their own independence as the Indo-Greek Kingdom. Following the death of the most famous Indo-Greek king, Menander I around 140 BCE, the region was overrun by the Indo-Scythians, and then the Persian Parthian Empire around 50 CE. The arrival of the Parthians began the long tradition of Greco-Buddhist art, which was a syncretic form of art combining Buddhist imagery with heavy Hellenistic-Greek influences. This art form is credited with having the first representations of the Buddha in human form, rather than symbolically.

The Parthians were ousted from Swat by the Kushans, based in the Peshawar valley. Kushan rule began what is considered by many to be the golden age of Gandhara. Under the greatest Kushan king, Kanishka, Swat became an important region for the production of Buddhist art, and numerous Buddhists shrines were built in the area. As a patron of Mahayana Buddhism, new Buddhists stupas were built and old ones were enlarged. The Chinese pilgrim Fa-Hsien, who visited the valley around 403 CE, mentions 500 monasteries.

Hephthalite 
Swat and the wider region of Gandhara were overrun by the Iranian Hephthalites around about 465 CE. Under the rule of Mihirakula, Buddhism was suppressed as he 
himself became virulently anti-Buddhist after a perceived slight against him by a Buddhist monk. Under his rule, Buddhist monks were reportedly killed, and Buddhist shrines attacked. He himself appears to have been inclined towards the Shaivism sect of Hinduism.

In around 520 CE, the Chinese monk Song Yun visited the area, and recorded that area had been in ruin and ruled by a leader that did not practice the laws of the Buddha. The Tang-era Chinese monk Xuanzang recorded the decline of Buddhism in the region, and ascendance of Hinduism in the region. According to him, of the 1400 monasteries that had supposedly been there, most were in ruins or had been abandoned.

Hindu Shahi 

Following the collapse of Buddhism in Swat following the Hephthalite invasion, Swat was ruled by the Hindu Shahi dynasty beginning in the 8th century, who made their capital at Udigram in lower Swat. The Shahis built an extensive array of temples and other architectural buildings, of which ruins remain today. Under their rule, Hinduism ascended, and Sanskrit is believed to have been the lingua franca of the locals during this time.  By the time of the Muslim conquests, the population in the region was predominantly Hindu, though Buddhism persisting in the valley until the 10th century, after which the area became largely Muslim. Hindu Shahi rulers built fortresses to guard and tax the commerce through this area, and ruins dating back to their rule can be seen on the hills at the southern entrance of Swat, at the Malakand Pass.

Muslim rule 

Around 1001 CE, the last Hindu Shahi king, Jayapala was decisively defeated at the Battle of Peshawar (1001) by Mahmud of Ghazni, thereby ending 2 centuries of Hindu rule over Gandhara. Sometime later, ethnic Swatis entered the area along with Sultans from Kunar (present-day Afghanistan).

In the 1500s, the Swat valley became occupied by Yusufzai Afghans and Islam became the dominant religion of the region.

Yousafzai State of Swat 

The Yousafzai State of Swat was a kingdom established in 1849 by the Muslim saint Akhund Abdul Gaffur, more commonly known as Saidu Baba, that was ruled by chiefs known as Akhunds. It was then recognized as a princely state in alliance with the British Indian Empire between 1926 and 1947, after which the Akhwand acceded to the newly independent state of Pakistan. Swat continued to exist as an autonomous region until it was dissolved in 1969, and incorporated into Khyber Pakhtunkhwa Province (formerly called NWFP).

Taliban destruction of Buddhist relics

The region was seized by the Tehrik-i-Taliban in late-2007, and its highly-popular tourist industry was subsequently decimated until Pakistani control was re-established in mid-2009 after a month-long campaign. During their occupation, the Taliban attacked Nobel laureate Malala Yousafzai in 2012, who at the time was a young school-girl who wrote a blog for BBC Urdu detailing life under Taliban rule, and their curb on girls' education.

Kushan-era Buddhist stupas and statues in the Swat Valley were demolished by the Taliban, and the Jehanabad Buddha's face was blown up using dynamite, but was repaired by a group of Italian restorers in a nine-year-long process. The Taliban and looters subsequently destroyed many of Pakistan's Buddhist artifacts, and deliberately targeted Gandhara Buddhist relics for destruction. Gandhara artifacts remaining from the demolitions were thereafter plundered by thieves and smugglers.

Economy 
Approximately 38% of economy of Swat depends on tourism and 31% depends on agriculture.

Agriculture 
Gwalerai village located near Mingora is one of those few villages which produces 18 varieties of apples due to its temperate climate in summer. The apple produced here is consumed in Pakistan as well as exported to other countries. It is known as ‘the apple of Swat’.
Swat is famous for peach production mostly grown in the valley bottom plains and accounts for about 80% of the peach production of the country. Mostly marketed in the national markets with a brand name of "Swat Peaches". The supply starts in April and continues till September because of a diverse range of varieties grown.

Demographics 

At the time of the 2017 census the district had a population of 2,308,624, of which 1,171,947 were males and 1,136,545 females. Rural population was 1,612,803 (69.86%) while the urban population was 695,821 (30.14%). The literacy rate was 50.27% - the male literacy rate was 65.25% while the female literacy rate was 35.10%. 1,811 people in the district were from religious minorities.

Swat is mostly inhabited by Pashtuns who make up 90.78% of the population. The dominant tribe is the Yusufzai tribe. The language spoken in the valley is Pashto (mainly the Yousafzai dialect). Other languages, mainly the Kohistani languages of Torwali and Kalami, are spoken by 7.35% of the population, and form the majority in the Swat Kohistan region of Upper Swat.

Education 
According to the Alif Ailaan Pakistan Education Rankings for 2017, Swat with a score of 53.1, is ranked 86 out of 155 districts in terms of education. Furthermore, the Swat schools infrastructure scores 90.26 which ranks it on number 31 out of 155.

Ethnic groups

 Pashtuns
 Durrani (Abdali)
 Yusufzai
 Gujjars
 Torwalis
 Gawri/Kalami people

Administrative divisions 
Swat is subdivided into 7 administrative divisions Tehsils:
 Babuzai
 Matta
 Khwaza Khela
 Barikot
 Kabal
 Charbagh
 Bahrain

Each tehsil comprises certain numbers of union councils. Swat has  65 union councils: 56 rural and 9 urban.

According to the Khyber Pakhtunkhwa Local Government Act, 2013, a new local governments system was introduced, in which Swat is included. This system has 67 wards, in which the total amount of village councils are around 170, while neighbourhood councils number around 44.

Politics 
The region elects three male members of the National Assembly of Pakistan (MNAs), one female MNA, seven male members of the Provincial Assembly of Khyber Pakhtunkhwa (MPAs) and two female MPAS. In the 2002 National and Provincial elections, the Muttahida Majlis-e-Amal, an alliance of religious political parties, won all the seats.

Provincial Assembly

Notable people

 Mubarika Yusufzai
 Wāli of Swat
 Mahmood Khan
 Malala Yousafzai
 Ziauddin Yousafzai
Muhib Ullah Khan
 Anwar Ali
 Nazia Iqbal
 Ghazala Javed
 Afzal Khan Lala
 Haider Ali Khan
 Malak Jamroz Khan
 Rahim Khan
 Nasirul Mulk
 Badar Munir
 Murad Saeed
 Shaheen Sardar Ali
 Rahim Shah
 Sherin Zada

See also

 1974 Hunza earthquake
 2009 refugee crisis in Pakistan
 Akhund of Swat
 Lower Swat Valley
 List of tourist attractions in Swat
 Oḍḍiyāna
 Swat (princely state)
 Lower Dir
 Upper Dir
 Chitral
 Buner
 Bannu
 Kaghan Valley
 Kohistan
 Operation Black Thunderstorm
 Operation Rah-e-Rast
 Panjigram
 Pushtu People
 Barikot
 Ghoriwala
 Swati
 Srivastava

References

Bibliography

External links

 Visit Swat Valley
 Swat Valley Photos

 
Hill stations in Pakistan
Valleys of Khyber Pakhtunkhwa
Indus basin
Buddhism in Pakistan